Gavin Woods may refer to:

 Gavin Woods (politician) (born 1947), South African politician
 Gavin Woods (water polo) (born 1978), Australian water polo player